Churchill Park may refer to:

Churchillparken in Copenhagen, Denmark
Churchill Park, Lautoka, a stadium in Lautoka, Fiji
Churchill Park, Glendowie in Auckland, New Zealand
Churchill National Park in Melbourne, Australia
Churchill Park, St. John's, a suburb of St. John's, Newfoundland, Canada
Sir Winston Churchill Provincial Park, Alberta, Canada
Energlyn & Churchill Park railway station, a railway station in Caerphilly, Wales

See also